Rebecca Indermaur (born 1976) is a Swiss film and television actress. She is best known for her roles as Theres in the 2010 horror film Sennentuntschi, Geissenpeterin in the 2015 children's film Heidi, and as Mona in the 2018 romantic comedy-drama Amur senza fin.

Early life and family 
Rebecca Indermaur was born in 1976 and raised in Chur, Grissons and is a member of the In der Maur family. Her father is Swiss painter Robert Indermaur. She was introduced to acting by her parents who ran and lived above a small theater, Klibühni Schnidrzunft, often participating in theatrical performances and art shows. She attended Bern University of Music and Theater in Bern, Switzerland.

Career 
Indermaur has had roles in various films and television shows including Easy Tiger (2008), Sennentuntschi (2010), Die Käserei in Goldingen (2010), Tatort: Skalpell (2012), Nebelgrind (2012), Heidi (2015), and Rider Jack (2015). She has also been in Foggrind and Crime Scene:Suicide. In 2018 she starred in the horror-thriller film The Shed. Indermaur, a native German speaker, learned to speak Romansh for her lead role as Mona in the 2018 romantic television feature Amur senza fin, the first Romansh television feature film.

Filmography 
Indermaur's filmography includes:

References

External links

Living people
1976 births
21st-century Swiss actresses
Rebecca
People from Chur
Swiss film actresses
Swiss television actresses
University of Bern alumni
Date of birth missing (living people)